Mark Northfield (born 5 December 1972) is an English pianist and rock musician, based in London.

Biography
Northfield is a classically trained pianist, arranger and songwriter. He grew up in Norfolk, England and moved to London in 1999 to pursue his music career. He regularly works as an accompanist for ballet and contemporary dance classes at Arts Ed, London Contemporary Dance School and the Royal Academy of Dance.

Discography

Albums
2002 Anachronisms
2008 Ascendant
2012 Alterations

Singles
July 2011 Death Of Copyright EP 
 "Death of Copyright"
 "The Day Before You Came" (ABBA Cover)
 "Headlonging (Stretched Out)"
 "The Forecaster"

External links

 Review of Ascendant
 Mark Northfield on Soundcloud

1972 births
Living people
English rock musicians
English songwriters
English male singers
People from Cambridge
21st-century English singers
21st-century British male singers
British male songwriters